Gemco Players Community Theatre Inc. is an Australian community theatre company based in Emerald, Victoria.
Gemco stands for the townships in the Dandenong Ranges:
Gembrook
Emerald
Monbulk, Macclesfield and Menzies Creek
Cockatoo 

The company usually stages two full length main stage productions per year in addition to shows performed by their youth active theatre programme and the annual Dandenong Ranges One Act Play Festival which takes place on the third weekend of July each year. Among the company's repertoire are plays and musicals, including original work written by local playwrights. 

Gemco Players also provide actors for Murder on the Puffing Billy Express and Day out with Thomas events at Puffing Billy Railway.

References

External links
 Gemco's official web-site: -  http://gemcoplayers.org/

Amateur theatre companies in Australia